Peter Hallward is a political philosopher, best known for his work on Alain Badiou and Gilles Deleuze. He has also published works on post-colonialism and contemporary Haiti. Hallward is a member of the editorial collective of the journal Radical Philosophy and a contributing editor to Angelaki: Journal of the Theoretical Humanities.

After completing his PhD at Yale University in French and African-American studies, Hallward became a lecturer, and then reader, of French philosophy and literature at King's College London from 1999 to 2004. He then joined the Centre for Research in Modern European Philosophy, which relocated from Middlesex University to Kingston University. He is now a professor of Modern European Philosophy at Kingston University.

Work 
In 2016, Hallward was working on a three part project on key philosophers of political will: Rousseau, Blanqui, and Marx. He is simultaneously working on a larger book entitled 'The Will of the People,' which will "develop and defend a notion of democratic political will, understood as a rational, deliberate, and autonomous capacity for collective self-determination."

Bibliography

Books

Edited volumes

Hallward, Peter, and Knox Peden, eds.(2012) Concept and Form Volume 1: Selections from the Cahiers Pour L'Analyse. Vol. 1. London: Verso, 
Hallward, Peter, and Knox Peden, eds. (2012) Concept and Form Volume 2: Interviews and essays on the Cahiers pour l'Analyse. Vol. 2. London: Verso, 
Hallward, Peter, and Philippe Le Goff, eds. (2018) The Blanqui Reader: Political Writings, 1830-1880 London: Verso,

Journal articles

Translations

Citations

External links
Hallward's page at Kingston University
Hallward's archive at Radical Philosophy
Angelaki The Journal of the Theoretical Humanities
Save Middlesex Philosophy
Audio file of lecture by Peter Hallward on communism titled 'Communism of the Intellect, Communism of the Will'

Living people
Canadian political philosophers
Canadian philosophers
French–English translators
Academics of Kingston University
Academics of Middlesex University
Year of birth missing (living people)
Deleuze scholars